Lawn Point Provincial Park is a provincial park in British Columbia, Canada.

The 584 ha. park is located south of Quatsino Sound on the west coast of northern Vancouver Island. It can be accessed by land via the town of Port Alice on a series of logging roads.

External links
Official Ministry of Environment Site
BC Geographical Names: Lawn Point Park

Provincial parks of British Columbia
Quatsino Sound region
Year of establishment missing